Peter Masterson (born Carlos Bee Masterson Jr.; June 1, 1934 – December 18, 2018) was an American actor, director, producer, and writer.

Life and career 
Masterson often worked with his cousin, writer Horton Foote. Acting from the mid-1960s to the mid-1980s, including 1975's The Stepford Wives as Walter Eberhart, since then he concentrated mostly on directing and producing. Actress Mary Stuart Masterson is his daughter; she appeared with her father in The Stepford Wives, playing one of his daughters. His other acting credits include roles in Ambush Bay (1966), In the Heat of the Night (1967), Counterpoint (1968), Von Richthofen and Brown (1971), Tomorrow (1972), The Exorcist (1973), Man on a Swing (1974), and Gardens of Stone (1987).

Masterson co-wrote (with Larry L. King) the books for the hit musical The Best Little Whorehouse in Texas (1978) and its short-lived sequel The Best Little Whorehouse Goes Public (1994). In 1980, he produced the ABC television movie, City in Fear based on an idea by screenwriter William Goldman —- an idea that became the well-reviewed 1979 novel Panic on Page One by Linda Stewart, and the television script by Albert Ruben. The cast was led by Robert Vaughn and David Janssen in his final role before his death that year.  In 1985, he directed The Trip to Bountiful, for which Geraldine Page won the Academy Award for Best Actress. The film also featured his wife, Carlin Glynn who had previously won a Tony Award for her role in Whorehouse. His directing credits additionally include Full Moon in Blue Water (1988), Night Game (1989), Blood Red (1989), Convicts (1991), Arctic Blue (1993), The Only Thrill (1997), Lost Junction (2003), and Whiskey School (2005).

Masterson died at the age of 84 on December 18, 2018, after suffering a fall at his home. He had received a diagnosis of Parkinson's disease 14 years earlier.

Select filmography

References

External links
 Peter Masterson and Carlin Glynn Papers at the Harry Ransom Center 
 
 
 
 Pete Masterson at the University of Wisconsin's Actors Studio audio collection

1934 births
2018 deaths
American male film actors
Drama Desk Award winners
Rice University alumni
Male actors from Houston
Writers from Houston
American film directors
Film producers from Texas
Accidental deaths from falls